The Manageress is a television series about a woman who becomes manager of a professional football team. It ran from 1989 to 1990 and had two seasons. The series starred Cherie Lunghi as Gabriella Benson and Warren Clarke as the chairman of the second division club. It was independently produced for Channel 4 by Glenn Wilhide and Sophie Belhetchet at their production company, ZED Ltd.  It was written by Stan Hey and Neville Smith and directed by Christopher King. The series aired for two series of six episodes on Channel 4 in 1989 and 1990.

The first-season episodes were published by Penguin Books in novel form in 1989. The author was named as Stan Hey.

The series was dubbed into French for French television and the title was translated as Miss Manager et ses footballeurs.
German title was Unser Boss ist eine Frau.

Cast
Cherie Lunghi – Gabriella Benson
Warren Clarke – Martin Fisher
Tom Georgeson – Eddie Johnson
Adam Bareham – Anthony Coombs
Paul Clarkson – Keith Nicholl
Glyn Grimstead – Trevor Coughlan
Chris Walker – Brian Rimmer
Paul Geoffrey – Simon Benson
David Cheesman – Charlie O'Keefe
Robbie Gee – Tony Morris
Mark Adams – Perry Gardner
James Garbutt – Cedric Deness
Alan Rowe – Charles Edwards
David Sibley – Steve Simms
Jill Johnson – Marjorie
Shay Gorman – Norman Williams
Mark Haddigan – Dave McGregor
Mark McGann – Gary Halliwell
Stephen Tompkinson – Jim Wilson
Joe Dixon – Terry Moir
Patrick Drury – Mark Sadler
Gavin Kitchen – Kevin Hedworth
Anthony Trent – Ken Allen
Paul McKenzie – Paul Kennedy

Episode List

Season One
 A Man's Game
 Fit
 The Management Reserves the Right
 Collapsible Brollies
 One of Us
 Home and Away

Season Two
 Doing the Business
 Pingvin Lakrids
 Steal Your Heart Away
 A Hundred and Ten Percent
 A Match for Anyone
 At the End of the Day

References

External links

The Manageress at the BFI database

1989 British television series debuts
1990 British television series endings
1980s British drama television series
1990s British drama television series
Channel 4 television dramas
British sports television series
English-language television shows
Television shows set in the United Kingdom